Kuskan is a small town in Mersin Province, Turkey

Geography 

It is a part of Gülnar district of Mersin Province. The population was 2256 as of 2012.

Economy 

Kuskan is a typical agricultural town. Traditional crops are cereals. But lately some farmers try other crops such as grape, apple,  pistachio and olive.  There are a few carpet weaving looms in the town. But weaving is on the decline.

References 

Populated places in Mersin Province
Towns in Turkey
Populated places in Gülnar District